Thomas Francis Fremantle, 2nd Baron Cottesloe, 3rd Baron Fremantle (30 January 1830 – 13 April 1918), was a British businessman and Conservative politician.

Biography

Early life
Thomas Francis Fremantle was born on 30 January 1830. He was the eldest son of Thomas Fremantle, 1st Baron Cottesloe, and the grandson of Vice-Admiral Thomas Fremantle and Elizabeth Wynne Fremantle, the diarist. His mother was Louisa Elizabeth, daughter of Sir George Nugent and a descendant of the Schuyler family and the Van Cortlandt family of British North America.

Career
He entered Parliament as one of three representatives for Buckinghamshire in an 1876 by-election (succeeding the ennobled Benjamin Disraeli), a seat he held until 1885. He was also involved in business and became a director of the London, Brighton and South Coast Railway in January 1868, and served as its chairman from June 1896 to February 1908. He was chairman of the Buckinghamshire County Council until 1904.

Personal life and death
He married Lady Augusta Henrietta, daughter of John Scott, 2nd Earl of Eldon, in 1859. She died in 1906. He survived her by twelve years and died in April 1918, at the age of eighty-eight. He was succeeded in his titles by his eldest son Thomas.

References
Kidd, Charles, Williamson, David (editors). Debrett's Peerage and Baronetage (1990 edition). New York: St Martin's Press, 1990.

External links 
 

of the Austrian Empire

1830 births
1918 deaths
Barons in the Peerage of the United Kingdom
Fremantle, Thomas
Fremantle, Thomas
Fremantle, Thomas
Fremantle, Thomas
London, Brighton and South Coast Railway people
English people of Dutch descent
Schuyler family
Eldest sons of British hereditary barons
Barons of Austria